At the Villa Rose may refer to:

 At the Villa Rose (novel), a 1910 novel by the British novelist AEW Mason featuring Inspector Hanaud
At the Villa Rose (play), a 1920 stage version of the novel, by AEW Mason
 At the Villa Rose (1920 film), a British silent film adaptation starring Manora Thew
 At the Villa Rose (1930 film), a British film adaptation starring Austin Trevor
At the Villa Rose (1940 film), a British film adaptation starring Kenneth Kent.

See also
 The Mystery of the Villa Rose, a 1930 French film adaptation